Call for Heroes: Pompolic Wars is a 2007 action RPG video game originally developed for Microsoft Windows by Serbian studio Quotix Software, and published by Strategy First. The game was supposed to be published for Wii by the now-defunct Data Design Interactive but was ultimately cancelled.

Reception
The PC version of the game was panned, IGN gave the game the rare score of 1.2/10, and GameSpot gave the game a 2/10. The game was criticized for poor design and glitches, subpar gameplay and lackluster dialogue and storyline; it also sold poorly.

References

Role-playing video games
Action role-playing video games
Fantasy video games
Video games developed in Serbia
Cancelled Wii games
Windows games
Windows-only games
2007 video games
Strategy First games
North America-exclusive video games